The 2001 uprising in Herat was a coordinated insurrection and uprising in the Afghan city of Herat as part of the United States war in Afghanistan. The city was captured on November 12 by Northern Alliance forces as well as Special Forces of the United States, the United Kingdom and the Islamic Republic of Iran.

The combatants
The U.S. Special Operations teams consisted of U.S. Army Rangers and Delta Force under the command of CENTCOM General Tommy Franks. Iranian forces consisted of agents of the Quds Force under the command of Major General Yahya Rahim Safavi, commander of the IRGC, and Major General Qassem Soleimani, the commander of Iran's Quds Force. The Northern Alliance faction consisted of over 5,000 militiamen under the command of Ismail Khan, a commander in the previous Soviet Invasion of Afghanistan and former governor of Herat before the Taliban came into power in 1995.

UK Special Forces for reasons of national security remained anonymous and did not reveal their formal command structure.

The plan

The plan, organized by General Franks and General Safavi, was for Iranian Special Forces to discreetly enter the city and form an insurrection against the Taliban. This sudden event was to coincide with the entrance of Ismail Khan's band of Northern Alliance militia members into the city. Meanwhile, a team of U.S. Special Forces and CIA agents would oversee the operation in Tehran alongside Iranian military intelligence.

The operation
Combat operations began on October 7, 2001. Towards the end of the month, U.S. air strikes hit targets in and around Herat, including tanks, communications facilities, and tunnel complexes. This also includes the Herat airport, where Russian-made fighters were destroyed.

On 11 November 2001, U.S. Special Forces Operational Detachment Alpha 554 ("Tiger 08") was inserted by helicopter near Herat. As planned, Iranian commandos secretly entered Herat to begin the insurrection on November 12, which successfully gave way to what Ismail Khan claimed to be, the local uprising against the Taliban leaders. The Northern Alliance, Shi'ite Hazara factions, and a small group of U.S. Special Forces then entered the city. Herati residents also took part in the uprising with sticks, knives, and guns hidden throughout the populace. The city fell as the Taliban fled towards the mountains along the Iranian border, leaving behind several abandoned tanks. Prisoners, including Chechen and Arab volunteers, were taken to undisclosed locations.

Aftermath
The uprising was met with celebratory gunfire from residents. Iranian media even went as far as to report widespread celebration including 'dancing on the rooftops' and honking car horns. Ismail Khan consolidated his power as Amir of western Afghanistan, reportedly accepting truck loads of money from Iran over the following month to secure loyalty of his forces. Khan granted amnesty for former Taliban fighters, but warned of repercussions if said fighters were to take up arms once again.

Khan remained governor of Herat until 2004, when he was dismissed by Afghan President Hamid Karzai. Khan's dismissal was met with violent protests.

References

External links
 http://www.economist.com/people/displayStory.cfm?Story_ID=842507 As Good As It Gets – Ismail Khan
 https://web.archive.org/web/20060908134338/http://www.number-10.gov.uk/output/Page1668.asp Prime Minister's Speech To Parliament in the War On Terror

Afghanistan conflict (1978–present)
Battles of the War in Afghanistan (2001–2021)
Battles of the War in Afghanistan (2001–2021) involving the United States
Operations involving American special forces
Battles involving Iran
Conflicts in 2001
History of Herat
Military operations involving Quds Force
November 2001 events in Asia
Rebellions in Afghanistan
Qasem Soleimani
Battles in 2001